Washington, D.C. is a 1967 novel by Gore Vidal. The sixth novel in his Narratives of Empire series of historical novels (although the first one published), it begins in 1937 and continues into the Cold War, tracing the families of Senator James Burden Day and influential newspaper publisher Blaise Sanford.

This book is the least historical and most novelistic of any of the seven books. The seventh book in the series, The Golden Age, takes place during nearly the same span of years with many of the same characters, and needed to be written around the events of Washington, D.C.

The novel is written in the third person and is inspired by the novels of Henry James.

References 

Novels set in the 1930s
Novels set during the Cold War
Novels by Gore Vidal
Little, Brown and Company books
American historical novels
Third-person narrative novels
Novels set in Washington, D.C.